The 2006 Campeonato Mineiro de Futebol do Módulo I was the 92nd season of Minas Gerais's top-flight professional football league. The season began on January 22 and ended on April 2. Cruzeiro won the title for the 34th time.

Participating teams

League table

Final Tournament

Finals

First leg

Second leg

References 

Campeonato Mineiro seasons
Mineiro